Walter Convents (born 8 November 1948) is a German fencer. He competed in the individual and team sabre events at the 1972 Summer Olympics.

References

1948 births
Living people
German male fencers
Olympic fencers of West Germany
Fencers at the 1972 Summer Olympics
Sportspeople from Bonn